Baron Greenway, of Stanbridge Earls in the County of Southampton, is a title in the Peerage of the United Kingdom. It was created in 1927 for Sir Charles Greenway, 1st Baronet, one of the founders of the Anglo-Persian Oil Company. He had already been created a Baronet, of Stanbridge Earls in the County of Southampton, in 1919.  the titles are held by his great-grandson, the fourth Baron, who succeeded his father in 1975. Lord Greenway is one of the ninety elected hereditary peers that remain in the House of Lords after the passing of the House of Lords Act 1999, and sits as a cross-bencher.

Barons Greenway (1927)
Charles Greenway, 1st Baron Greenway (1857–1934)
Charles Kelvynge Greenway, 2nd Baron Greenway (1888–1963)
Charles Paul Greenway, 3rd Baron Greenway (1917–1975)
Ambrose Charles Drexel Greenway, 4th Baron Greenway (b. 1941)

The heir presumptive is the present holder's nephew Nicholas Walter Paul Greenway (b. 1988).

References

Kidd, Charles, Williamson, David (editors). Debrett's Peerage and Baronetage (1990 edition). New York: St Martin's Press, 1990, 

}

Baronies in the Peerage of the United Kingdom
Noble titles created in 1927